In geology, enderbite is an igneous rock of the charnockite series, consisting essentially of quartz, antiperthite (or perthite), orthopyroxene (usually hypersthene) and magnetite, and is equivalent to an orthopyroxene bearing tonalite.  It is named for its occurrence in Enderby Land, Antarctica.

References

 Classification of igneous rocks, 2nd edition, 2002, by R.W. Le Maitre et al.

Plutonic rocks